The Campus Garching is a campus of the Technical University of Munich and a number of other research institutes, located around 10 km north of Munich in Garching. At the same time, it constitutes a district of the city. With more than 7,500 employees and around 17,000 students, it is one of the largest centers for science, research and teaching in Germany.

Facilities 
The Campus Garching is the largest campus of the Technical University of Munich. It is joined by numerous research facilities, including four Max Planck Institutes.

Technical University of Munich 

Five departments of the Technical University of Munich are located in Garching:
  TUM Department of Chemistry
  TUM Department of Informatics
  TUM Department of Mathematics
  TUM Department of Mechanical Engineering
  TUM Department of Physics

A new €540 million, 45,000 m2 building for the TUM Department of Electrical and Computer Engineering is currently in construction and the department is scheduled to move by 2025.

Research centers include:
 FRM II (Research Neutron Source Heinz Maier-Leibnitz)
 Munich School of Engineering
 Munich School of BioEngineering
 TUM Institute for Advanced Study
 Walter Schottky Institute
 TUM Graduate School
 Catalysis Research Center
 International Graduate School of Science and Engineering

Additionally, TUM operates a meteorological measurement tower, the Oskar von Miller Tower, and the TUM Fire Department on the campus.

Ludwig Maximilian University of Munich 
The Ludwig Maximilian University of Munich has numerous facilities on the Campus Garching, including seven chairs of the Faculty of Physics and sections of the Faculty of Geology.

Max Planck Society 
Four research institutes of the Max Planck Society operate on the Campus Garching:
 Max Planck Institute for Astrophysics
 Max Planck Institute for Extraterrestrial Physics
 Max Planck Institute for Plasma Physics
 Max Planck Institute of Quantum Optics

A new building for the Max Planck Institute for Physics is currently in construction and the institute is expected to move in 2022.

Other research institutes 

The headquarters of the European Southern Observatory and its Supernova Planetarium & Visitor Centre are located on the campus.

Five research clusters are located on the campus:
 Center for Integrated Protein Science Munich
 
 Nanosystems Initiative Munich
 Munich Cluster for Systems Neurology
 Excellence Cluster Universe

Other research institutes include:
 EUROfusion

Companies 
Companies that have established offices on the campus include:
 General Electric
 T-Systems
 Caverion

Infrastructure 

In recent years, the Garching campus has started developing into a campus university. In 2019, a new €45 million canteen opened, capable of serving 7,300 meals a day. The first student residences are currently in construction.

A 36,000 m2 multipurpose building named GALILEO is in the final stages of construction. When completed, it will house offices, stores, restaurants, a church, a hotel and convention center, and guest apartments. GALILEO is being developed as a public–private partnership between the state of Bavaria and private investors.

A Hyperloop test track is currently being built on the campus, following the successes of the student team WARR at the SpaceX Hyperloop pod competitions, where they won all races.

Geography 

The Hochschul- und Forschungszentrum Garching is a district of the city of Garching, rather than a single legal entity. It is located on the left bank of the Isar, about 2 to 3 kilometers northeast of Garching's city center, about 17 kilometers north-northeast of the city center of Munich, and about 16 kilometers southwest of Munich Airport. Located in the Munich gravel plain, the campus' elevation is flat throughout.

Both streams join northeast of the campus and flow into the Isar soon after.

Transport 

The campus is located near the Garching-Nord exit of the Bundesautobahn 9. The streets on campus are named after important scientists: Hans Kopfermann, Karl Schwarzschild, Ludwig Prandtl, Ludwig Boltzmann, Walther Meissner, Georg Christoph Lichtenberg, James Franck, and Ernst Otto Fischer.

For a long time, accessibility to the campus by public transport was problematic. The Technical University of Munich operated its own shuttle bus between its main campus and the Garching campus. Public buses ran from the Studentenstadt U-Bahn station, and later from Garching-Hochbrück. Those who missed the last bus in the early evening had to rely on hitchhiking to get home, which earned the campus the nicknames Garchosibirsk and Novogarchinsk.

Since 2006, the campus has been connected to the Munich U-Bahn network with the Garching-Forschungszentrum station, with an interval of 5 minutes during rush hour. It takes around half an hour to get to the city center.

History 

In 1957, the first German research reactor, the 4 MW , marked the beginning of the Garching campus. In operation until 2000, its domed building in the shape of an "atomic egg" became a landmark of the city of Garching, and has been listed as a historical monument. Located right next to it, its successor Forschungsreaktor München II has been in operation since 2004.

The Max Planck Institute for Plasma Physics was established on the campus in 1960. In 1980, the European Southern Observatory relocated from Geneva to its new building on the Garching campus.

Since the 1960s, a relocation of major parts of the Technical University of Munich to Garching has been discussed. Until the decision to build a U-Bahn connection, the proposal had been repeatedly called into question. The Department of Physics moved to Garching in 1970, the Department of Chemistry in 1978, the Department of Mechanical Engineering in 1997 and the departments of Informatics and Mathematics in 2002. A new building for the Department of Electrical and Computer Engineering is currently in construction and the department is scheduled to move by 2025.

References

External links 
 
 

Technical University of Munich
Campuses
Garching bei München